A twin suicide bombing of an Egged bus occurred in the French Hill neighborhood of Jerusalem on 18 May 2003. Seven passengers were killed in the attack, and 20 injured. A few minutes after the first attack, a second suicide bomber blew himself up at the entrance to the village of Dahiya el-Barid, near Jerusalem. Only the bomber was killed in what appeared to be a premature detonation.

The attacks 
The first attack took place at 5:45 am, during the morning rush hour, when a Palestinian suicide bomber disguised as a Haredi detonated a nail-studded explosive belt strapped to his body on a No. 6 passenger bus near the French Hill section of northern Jerusalem. Seven civilians were killed in the attack, including four Russian immigrants and an Arab resident of Jerusalem. In addition, 20 were injured in the attack, four of them seriously.

A few minutes after the first attack, another suicide bomber blew himself up at the entrance to the village of Dahiya el-Barid, near Jerusalem. Only the bomber was killed in what appeared to be a premature detonation.

The perpetrator 
Although there was no immediate claim of responsibility for the attack, relatives of 19-year-old Hamas activist Bassem Jamil Tarkrouri, who originated from Hebron, officially identified him as the perpetrator of the attack.

Official reactions
Involved parties
: Israeli officials spoke about the bombings, stating they "will continue to fight terror everywhere, at any time and in any way possible".

:
 Palestinian National Authority – PNA officials condemned the bombings.

 International
 – Secretary of State Colin Powell spoke about the bombings, stating "we in the strongest possible terms the horrific terrorist bombing."
 – Russian officials condemned the attack, and called on the international community to "intensify efforts to combat terrorism and activate peace efforts for the Mideast".

See also
French Hill attacks
Palestinian political violence

References

External links 
 Jerusalem rocked by 2 suicide bombings – published in The San Diego Union-Tribune on 18 May 2003

Mass murder in 2003
Suicide bombings in 2003
Hamas suicide bombings of buses
Terrorist incidents in Asia in 2003
Terrorist incidents in Jerusalem
2003 in Jerusalem
May 2003 events in Asia
Terrorist incidents in Jerusalem in the 2000s
East Jerusalem